Gipsy Love may refer to

Gipsy Love (operetta), 1910/1911, with music by Franz Lehár 
Gipsy Love, a song by Round 13